Kao Challengers is an action-adventure video game featuring Kao the Kangaroo developed by Tate Interactive and published by Atari Europe. Challengers is an enhanced remake of Kao the Kangaroo: Round 2, released a year earlier in Europe.

Plot
Kao Challengers has the same storyline as Kao the Kangaroo: Round 2.

Gameplay
The game contains over 20 levels in 5 worlds which have their own unique environment. There are also some bonus levels included. In the levels there are over 30 enemies with 7 fighting techniques. Enemies all have their own different personalities which can easily be recognised from the way they attack and defend. Kao can do many actions such as flying, throwing boomerangs, cones and other objects, swimming and skating. Cut scenes explain the story as the player progresses through the levels to help and guide them. Vehicles can be driven which include a snowboard, catapult, pelican, water barrel and motor boat. There is also a multiplayer mode where players can use 15 different weapons including bombs, fire flamer and a magneto. A lot of special effects have been put into the game such as motion blur and blending to make it a graphically enjoyable video game.

Reception 

The game has received mixed reviews, as GameRankings gave it a score of 56.12%, while Metacritic gave it a score of 57 out of 100.

Sequel 
The sequel to this game and Round 2 was titled Kao the Kangaroo: Mystery of the Volcano, and was released for the PC in 2006 exclusively in some non-English countries, serving as the character's swan song.

References

External links
Atari UK - Kao Challengers

2005 video games
Action-adventure games
Multiplayer and single-player video games
3D platform games
PlayStation Portable games
PlayStation Portable-only games
Kao the Kangaroo
Video games about kangaroos and wallabies
Video games about pirates
Video games about revenge
Video games set in Australia
Australian outback
Jungles in fiction
Video games developed in Poland